The Aberdare mole shrew (Surdisorex norae) is a species of mammal in the family Soricidae endemic to the Aberdare Mountains in Kenya. Its natural habitat is tropical high-elevation bamboo and grassland.

References

Surdisorex
Mammals of Kenya
Endemic fauna of Kenya
Taxonomy articles created by Polbot
Mammals described in 1906
Taxa named by Oldfield Thomas